Vincent Crawford Barnett (born February 19, 1965) is a former American football defensive back. He played for the Cleveland Browns in 1987.

References

1965 births
Living people
American football defensive backs
Arkansas State Red Wolves football players
Cleveland Browns players